In machine learning and computational learning theory, LogitBoost is a boosting algorithm formulated by Jerome Friedman, Trevor Hastie, and Robert Tibshirani.  The original paper casts the AdaBoost algorithm into a statistical framework.  Specifically, if one considers AdaBoost as a generalized additive model and then applies the cost function of logistic regression, one can derive the LogitBoost algorithm.

Minimizing the LogitBoost cost function

LogitBoost can be seen as a convex optimization. Specifically, given that we seek an additive model of the form

the LogitBoost algorithm minimizes the logistic loss:

See also
 Gradient boosting
 Logistic model tree

References

Classification algorithms
Ensemble learning
Machine learning algorithms